The Isfendiyarids or Isfendiyarid dynasty (Modern Turkish: İsfendiyaroğulları, İsfendiyaroğulları Beyliği), also known as the Beylik of Sinop, Beylik of Isfendiyar (İsfendiyar Beyliği), Jandarids or Beylik of Jandar (Candaroğulları, Candaroğulları Beyliği), was an Anatolian Turkoman beylik that ruled principally in the regions corresponding to present-day Kastamonu and Sinop provinces of Turkey, also covering parts of Zonguldak, Bartın, Karabük, Samsun, Bolu, Ankara and Çankırı provinces, between 1292 and 1461, in the Black Sea region of modern-day Turkey. The region is also known in Western literature as Paphlagonia, a name used for the same geographic area during the Roman period.

The founder of the beylik was Şemseddin Yaman Candar (also known as Temür Yaman Jandar); the beylik collapsed in 1461 when the Ottoman sultan Mehmed II annexed the region.

History
The Seljuq Sultan Masud II gave Kastamonu to Temür Yaman Jandar, a commander from the sultan's candar corps, in
thanks for rescuing him from Mongol captivity. This province, however, was already under the control of the Chobanids. Following Temür's death, his son Süleyman I conquered the province and annexed Safranbolu and Sinop, formerly ruled by the descendants of Mu‘in al-Din Suleyman. Süleyman then appointed his son Ibrahim I as governor to Sinop and a second son Ali to Safranbolu. Süleyman reigned under the authority of the Ilkhanate, the Mongols of Persia, until the death of the ruler Abu Sa'id.

Following the death of Süleyman I, his sons Ibrahim I and Ali fought for the throne. In 1339 Ibrahim was victorious and took over the rule of Kastamonu. Upon his death, his cousin Adil replaced him (1346–1361). When Adil died, his son Kötürüm Bayezid became bey. Bayezid fought twice with Kadi Burhan al-Din, the ruler of the Sivas region, and in 1383 lost Kastamonu to one of his own sons, Süleyman II, who received military support from the Ottoman sultan Murad I. Bayezid left for Sinop, and thus the Jandarid Principality was divided. After Bayezid's death in 1385, his son Isfendiyar succeeded him.

Based in Kastamonu, Süleyman II remained faithful to Murad I, his supporter in his revolt against his father, and participated in Ottoman campaigns in Europe in 1386 and 1389. Murad's successor, the aggressive Beyazid I launched an assault in 1391 on Kastamonu as part of an effort to control the Anatolian beyliks. Süleyman II was killed and Jandarids' rule in Kastamonu ended.

Meanwhile, fearing conflict with the powerful Ottomans, Isfendiyar requested immunity from Beyazid in return for being subject to Ottoman reign. Beyazid granted Isfendiyar an autonomy. Following the sultan's defeat by the Timurids in 1402, Isfendiyar recognized the authority of the Timurid's Khan Timur, who confirmed him in the traditional Jandarids' lands of Kastamonu, Kalecik, Tosya, and Çankırı.

After Timur left Anatolia, during the Ottoman Interregnum, Isfendiyar stood close to all the four sons of Beyazid avoiding any conflict. When one of his sons, Kasım claimed control over Çankırı and Tosya, and declared the annexation of these areas to the Ottoman Empire, the Jandarids' dominion was divided once more. But Isfendiyar revolted against the new sultan Murad II, only to be defeated, and retreated to Sinop (1423). Isfendiyar died in 1439, to be succeeded by his son Ibrahim II, who upon his death was replaced by Ismail in 1443.

After his conquest of Constantinople in 1453, the Ottoman sultan Mehmed II turned to Anatolia to unite the Anatolian beyliks and principalities under his rule. In 1461, joining forces with Ismail's brother Ahmed (the Red), he captured Sinop and ended the official reign of the Jandarid dynasty, although he appointed Ahmed as the governor of Kastamonu and Sinop, only to revoke Ahmed's appointment the same year. According to new research, this seems to have happened in 1464.

Dynasty
Following the incorporation of the principality in the Ottoman Empire, the ruling dynasty was offered various important functions within the Ottoman administration, which they maintained until its collapse in 1922. Descendants of the Jandarid dynasty live today as citizens of the Turkish Republic mostly in Istanbul and in Europe, using various family names. Ayşe Sultan, who was the last identified descendant of the Jandarid dynasty, having benefited from the status offered by the Ottoman Empire to the dynasty, died in 1981 in Ankara.

Flag
The flag of Jandarids may confuse many with what is now known as the Star of David.  In medieval times however, this was not solely a Jewish symbol, but also an Islamic one known as the Seal of Solomon (Suleiman, son of King David) and was extremely popular amongst the Turkish beyliks of Anatolia.  Another state known to use the seal on their flag was the Beylik of Karaman.

Culture
The Jandarids was located at a very important region in the northeast of Anatolia. They were quite significant in their area with their high population (420,000 in 1332) and political influence, existing along other beyliks and states in their era. Having reigned for about 170 years, Jandarids were quite advanced in architecture, cultural and social life and welfare. Also, many books in Turkish were written during their reign by court scientists and writers, including poems, books on medicine, chemistry, social sciences, and translations from Arabic and Persian.

Many architectural structures have remained from the Jandarid era in the region, including hammams, caravanserais, numerous mosques, inns, religious schools (madrassas) and libraries.

Economy
The 14th century geographer al-Umari notes that the seat of the beylik, Kastamonu was one of the most prominent provinces in that region, and that Sinop was one of the most important ports in the Black Sea where the Genoese managed a warehouse. These lay on a crucial trade route leading to the interior of Anatolia. The nearby province Sivas was then inhabited by many Genoese merchants, transporting the goods that would arrive from the east and the south to their ports in Trabzon, Samsun and Sinop. Venetian archives document close financial ties and trading existing between the Jandarids and the city states of Venice and Genoa. Kastamonu was also rich in natural resources such as iron ore and copper, which were important industrial raw materials.

In their trade with the Genoese, Jandarids used copper coins they minted bearing the image of two fish, and the inscription Dârü's-saâde-i Sinop ("The palace of Sinop").

Military
Jandarids had a light cavalry corps of 25,000. This vast military power had often contributed to the Ottoman campaigns in Rumelia as well as in Anatolia, including the siege of Constantinople. Being neighbors with the Byzantines, Jandarids aided to campaigns and raids here while preventing them to proceed further towards other beyliks.

Jandarids also possessed a shipyard in Sinop that equipped them with a strong naval force. The size of this force is unknown, however, it is known that this force was used in an attack to the Genoese outpost Kefe (Theodosia today, in Crimea, Ukraine).

Rulers

See also
 Karamanids
 Ramadanids
 Aydinids
 Sarukhanids
 Hamidids

References

External links
 http://www.dallog.com/beylikler/candaroglu.htm 
 CANDAROGULLARI BEYLIGI 

 
Anatolian beyliks
States and territories established in 1292
History of Kastamonu Province
History of Sinop Province
History of Karabük Province

ja:チャンダルル家